Each team's roster consisted of at least 15 skaters (forwards, and defencemen) and two goaltenders, and at most 20 skaters and three goaltenders. All ten participating nations, through the confirmation of their respective national associations, had to submit a roster by the first IIHF directorate.

Ages are as of 25 August 2022.

Group A

Canada
The roster was announced on 15 August 2022.

Head coach: Troy Ryan

Finland
The roster was announced on 3 August 2022.

Head coach: Juuso Toivola

Japan
The roster was announced on 10 August 2022.

Head coach: Yuji Iizuka

Switzerland
The roster was announced on 17 August 2022.

Head coach: Colin Muller

United States
The roster was announced on 14 August 2022.

Head coach: John Wroblewski

Group B

Czechia
The roster was announced on 26 July 2022.

Head coach: Carla MacLeod

Denmark
The roster was announced on 13 August 2022.

Head coach: Björn Edlund

Germany
A 28-player roster was announced on 13 August 2022. The final squad was revealed on 21 August 2022.

Head Coach: Thomas Schädler

Hungary
The roster was announced on 29 July 2022.

Head coach: Pat Cortina

Sweden
The roster was announced on 13 August 2022.

Head Coach: Ulf Lundberg

References

External links
Official website

rosters
IIHF Women's World Championship rosters